Elachista metallifera is a moth in the family Elachistidae. It was described by Oswald Bertram Lower in 1908. It is found in Australia, where it has been recorded from Queensland.

Taxonomy
The name metallifera is preoccupied by Mompha metallifera, described by Lord Walsingham in 1882. Furthermore, the identity of this species is uncertain, because the holotype is lost.

References

Moths described in 1908
metallifera
Moths of Australia